Maria Wilhelmina Strandberg née Söhrling (6 November 1845 –16 October 1914) was a Swedish operatic mezzo-soprano who performed at the Royal Theatre in Stockholm from 1867 to 1903, mainly in soubrette roles.

Biography
Born in Stockholm, Wilhelmina Söhling was the daughter of the music teacher and organist Wilhelm Söhrling (1822–1901) and Marie Elise Vretman.
After being brought up in a musical family, she studied  solo singing from 1862–65 at the Swedish Conservatory under Julius Günther, Isak Berg and Fredrika Stenhammar. She made her début at the Royal Theatre on 18 October 1867 as Jeannette in Nicolas Isouard's comic opera Joconde.

In the spring of 1868, she was engaged by the Royal Theatre, playing further soubrette roles in comic operas including Vattendragaren and  Les rendez-vous bourgeois. She soon moved on to more classical roles such as Zerlina Don Giovanni and Cherubino in The Marriage of Figaro. Other roles included Micaëla in Carmen, Magdalena in the Swedish première of Die Meistersinger von Nürnberg, Marta in Faust and Pamina in The Magic Flute.

On 18 October 1892, when she appeared as the Marquise in La fille du régiment, celebrating the 25th anniversary of the Royal Opera, she was awarded the Litteris et Artibus medal. She retired from the Royal Opera on 6 November 1903. She continued to live in Stockholm where she died on 16 October 1914.

Personal life
In 1878, she married  customs official Olof Strandberg (1847-1889), son of  opera singer (tenor), Olof Strandberg (1816-1882) and actress  Aurora Vilhelmina Strandberg.

References

19th-century Swedish women opera singers
Swedish operatic mezzo-sopranos
19th-century Swedish opera singers
1845 births
1914 deaths
Singers from Stockholm
Litteris et Artibus recipients